Satthwa is a village in Gwa Township, Rakhine State, Myanmar.

Transport 
Since 1999 it has been served by a station on the Myanmar Railways Network.

See also 
 Transport in Myanmar

References

External links 

 Mbendi map

Populated places in Rakhine State
Villages in Myanmar